Edward Burtynsky  (born February 22, 1955) is a Canadian photographer and artist known for his large format photographs of industrial landscapes. His works depict locations from around the world that represent the increasing development of industrialization and its impacts on nature and the human existence. It is most often connected to the philosophical concept of the sublime, a trait established by the grand scale of the work he creates, though they are equally disturbing in the way they reveal the context of rapid industrialization.

Burtynsky is the inaugural winner of the TED Prize for Innovation and Global Thinking in 2005. In 2016 he was the receiver of the Governor General's Awards in Visual and Media Arts for his collection of works thus far.

Burtynsky is an advocate for environmental conservationism and his work is deeply entwined in his advocacy. His work comments on the scars left by industrial capitalism while establishing an aesthetic for environmental devastation, the sublime-horrors discussed in a number of essays on the topic of his work. He sits on the board of Contact, Toronto's international festival of photography.

Early life 
Burtynsky was born in St. Catharines, Ontario, a blue-collar town where General Motors was the largest employer. His Father, Peter Burtynsky, was a Ukrainian immigrant who found work on the production line at the General Motors plant.  When Burtynsky was 11 years old, his father purchased a darkroom and cameras from a widow whose late husband had practiced amateur photography. Burtynsky was given two rolls of Tri-X film and told to make do with that or support the habit through his own means. Along with learning black and white photography, he learned black and white print. This would prove to be useful in the development of his own business to support his new-found habit as he began photographing events and providing portraits at his local Ukrainian community center, charging 50 cents per photograph. With the money he made, he travelled throughout the countryside of St. Catharines photographing the "pristine landscapes" of his childhood. This is where he would later attribute his interest in pursuing landscape photography.

Education and early career
From the mid-1970s to early 1980s, Burtynsky formally studied graphic arts and photography. He obtained a diploma in graphic design from Niagara College in Welland, Ontario, beginning his studies in 1974. After receiving his collegial diploma, he had not initially considered pursuing higher education, but quickly changed his mind when touring the Ryerson campus on a request from a former photography teacher of his. He enrolled and completed the four-year undergraduate program and obtained a Bachelor's in Photographic Arts (Media Studies Program) from Ryerson Polytechnical Institute in Toronto, Ontario, in 1982.

Burtynsky's earliest works, now donated to Ryerson University's Image Center are primarily taken in locations across Ontario and Western Canada. Influenced by American photographers such as Ansel Adams, Edward Weston and Carleton Watkins, these works consist mostly of colored landscapes. Some of his earliest original landscape photographs such as Landscape Study #1, North Carolina, USA (1979) and Landscape Study #2, Ontario, Canada (1981) served as portfolio submissions for Ryerson and displayed traces of his early exploration into the main themes of his work: human control over nature.  Burtynsky briefly worked in photography departments for IBM and the Ontario Hospital Association peri-graduation and in architecture post-graduation  until in 1985, he founded Toronto Image Works, a studio space that doubled as a darkroom rental facility, custom photo laboratory and training center for digital and new media.

Some of Burtynsky's breakout works post-graduation such as Breaking Ground: Mines, Railcuts and Homesteads (1983–85) and Vermont Quarries (1991-92) show a decisive transition toward the human impact themes that mark his later work. In many of these indicate an honest account of the ecology of human interaction and the pillaging of landscapes which include the dialogue between the human, machine and the earth.

Photography
Most of Burtynsky's exhibited photography (pre 2007) was taken with a large format, field camera, on large 4×5-inch sheet film and developed into high-resolution, large-dimension prints of various sizes and editions ranging from 18 × 22 inches to 60 × 80 inches. He often positions himself at high-vantage points over the landscape using elevated platforms, the natural topography, and more currently drones, helicopters and fixed-wing aircraft. Burtynsky describes the act of taking a photograph in terms of "The Contemplated Moment", evoking and in contrast to, "The Decisive Moment" of Henri Cartier-Bresson. He currently uses a high-resolution digital medium format camera.

Burtynsky's photographic style is characterized by the sublime nature of the scale of his photographs. His large-format view camera depicts humanity's scarring on the landscapes he makes his subject, with "astonishing color and relentless detail", always focusing on the consequences of global consumerism. Burtynsky's photography places the viewer in a state of non-intervention with the environments depicted. While the viewer witnesses the consequences of radicalized consumerism, the viewer is left to quietly contemplate its political articulation: neither a condemnation nor a celebration of the subject matter, simply an acknowledgement of its existence, to create dialogue, not to dichotomize.

Manufactured Landscapes (2003) 
Manufactured Landscapes is a collection of more than 60 large scale images, many as large as 48 by 60 inches, depicting Burtynsky's travels around the world capturing stunning transformations of nature into industrial landscapes. In 2003, Burtynsky developed a series of images conveying China's contemporary transformation into industrialization which was included as part of the exhibit. Using a 4×5 large format camera he presented the result of Western consumerism on the industrialization of China while depicting the effects of the environmental devastation caused by Chinese industrial ambitions in China.

Burtynsky photographs sweeping views of landscapes altered by industry: mine tailings, quarries, scrap piles. The grandeur of his images is often in tension with the compromised environments they depict. He has made several excursions to China to photograph that country's industrial emergence, and construction of one of the world's largest engineering projects, the Three Gorges Dam.

Photographic series
1983–1985 Breaking Ground: Mines, Railcuts and Homesteads, Canada, USA
1991–1992 Vermont Quarries, USA
1997–1999 Urban Mines: Metal Recycling, Canada Tire Piles, USA
1993–Carrara Quarries, Italy
1995–1996 Tailings, Canada
1999-2010 Oil Canada, China, Azerbaijan, USA
2000–Makrana Quarries, India
2000–2001 Shipbreaking, Bangladesh
2004–2006 China
2006–Iberia Quarries, Portugal
2007–Australian Mines, Western Australia
2009–2013 Water Canada, USA, Mexico, Europe, Asia, Iceland, India
2016 Salt Pans
2014–2018 Anthropocene
2014 Chai Eastern Europe

Other projects

Toronto Image Works
In 1985, Burtynsky established Toronto Image Works, a commercial photography lab, which has evolved into a facility that also offers darkroom rentals, equipment use and  digital new-media courses. In 1986 the facility opened a gallery space which displays the work of local and international artists.

Manufactured Landscapes (Documentary)
In 2006, Burtynsky was the subject of the documentary film, Manufactured Landscapes, that was shown at the 2007 Sundance Film Festival in the World Cinema Documentary Competition.

Watermark
Burtynsky and Jennifer Baichwal, who directed the 2006 documentary Manufactured Landscapes, are co-directors of the 2013 documentary film, Watermark. The film is part of his five-year project, Water, focusing on the way water is used and managed.

Anthropocene: The Human Epoch and The Anthropocene Project
The Anthropocene Project is a multidisciplinary body of work from collaborators Nicholas de Pencier, Burtynsky and Baichwal. Combining art, film, virtual reality, augmented reality, and scientific research, the project investigates human influence on the state, dynamic and future of the Earth. Anthropocene means a new era of geological time where human activity is the driving force behind environmental and geological change.

In September 2018 Anthropocene: The Human Epoch made its world premiere at the Toronto International Film Festival (TIFF). In 2019 it won the Rogers Best Canadian Film Award at the Toronto Film Critics Association Awards 2018. The filmmakers gave the $100,000 prize money to the runners-up and to TIFF's Share Her Journey initiative, which supports women in film.

Two complementary exhibitions also debuted in September 2018 at the Art Gallery of Ontario and National Gallery of Canada. In 2019 the exhibition toured to Fondazione MAST in Bologna, Italy.

In the Wake of Progress
Burtynsky's In the Wake of Progress: Images of the Industrial Landscape has been a webcast in 2003, and a touring immersive multimedia experience, blending music, photography and film, in 2021-22.

Publications by Burtynsky
Oil. Göttingen: Steidl, 2005. . Edited by Marcus Schubert. With essays by Michael Mitchell, William E. Rees, and Paul Roth. "Published in conjunction with exhibitions held at the Corcoran Gallery of Art, Washington, D.C., Oct. 3-Dec. 13, 2009 and Huis Marseille, Museum for Photography Amsterdam, Dec. 5, 2009-Feb. 28, 2010."
China. Göttingen: Steidl. 2005. . With essays by Ted Fishman, Mark Kingwell, Marc Mayer, and Burtynsky.
Manufactured Landscapes: The Photography of Edward Burtynsky. Ottawa, Ontario, Canada: National Gallery of Canada; New Haven and London: Yale University Press, 2005. . Edited by Lori Pauli. With essays by Mark Haworth-Booth and Kenneth Baker, interview by Michael Torosian.
Quarries. Göttingen: Steidl, 2007. . With essays by Michael Mitchell, "More urgent than beauty," "Rock of Ages," "Three marble mountains," "Dying for beauty," "Buy low, sell low," and "Inverted architecture."
Pentimento. Catalogue of an exhibition held at Flowers Central, London, 2010.
Water. Göttingen: Steidl, 2013. . Edited by Marcus Schubert. With essays by Wade Davis and Russell Lord. "Catalog of an exhibition held at the Contemporary Arts Center, New Orleans, Oct. 5, 2013-Jan. 19, 2014."
Essential Elements. Thames & Hudson, 2016. . With essay by William A. Ewing.
Salt Pans. Göttingen: Steidl, 2016. .
Anthropocene. Göttingen: Steidl, 2018. . With essays by Jennifer Baichwal, Nick De Pencier, Suzaan Boettger, Jan Zalasiewicz, Colin Waters, Margaret Atwood.

Group exhibitions
Civilisation: The Way We Live Now, Foundation for the Exhibition of Photography, Lausanne, 2022/23

Awards
Member of the Royal Canadian Academy of Arts.
Honorary doctorate in Laws, from Mt. Allison University, Sackville, New Brunswick, Canada
Honorary doctorate in Laws, from Queen's University, Kingston
Honorary doctorate in Fine Arts in Photography Study from Ryerson University (now Toronto Metropolitan University), Toronto
Honorary doctorate in Fine Arts, from Montserrat College of Art, Boston
2005: TED Prize
2006: Officer of the Order of Canada
2013: Geological Society of America President's Medal.
2013: Rogers Best Canadian Film Award at the 2013 Toronto Film Critics Association Awards for Watermark (2013).
2014: Best Feature Length Documentary at the 2014 Canadian Screen Awards for Watermark (2013).
2016: List of Laureates of the Governor General's Award in Visual and Media Arts, Canada Council, Ottawa, Canada
2018: Master of Photography, Photo London, London
2018: Peace Patron Award by The Mosaic Institute, an NGO based in Toronto working to promote pluralism reducing conflict in Canada and abroad.
2019: Rogers Best Canadian Film Award for Anthropocene: The Human Epoch at the Toronto Film Critics Association Awards 2018, a $100,000 prize
2019: Best Canadian Documentary Award for Anthropocene: The Human Epoch at the Vancouver Film Critics Circle Awards 2018
2020:Honorary Fellowship of the Royal Photographic Society, Bristol
2021: Outstanding Contribution to Photography, 2022 Sony World Photography Awards
2022: Induction into the International Photography Hall of Fame and Museum.

Collections
Burtynsky's work is held in the following permanent collection:
National Gallery of Canada, Ottawa, Ontario, Canada: 122 works (as of February 2021)

See also
New Topographics

References

General references
Granta, This overheating world. The Magazine of New Writing, 83. Fall 2003. Noah Richler: The Evidence of Man, Edward Burtynsky. p. 95.
Before the Flood. Essay by Gary Michael Dault. 2003
 "Industrial China’s Ravaging of Nature, Made Disturbingly Sublime," The New York Times, Manohla Dargis, June 20, 2007.

Further reading

External links

"The Human Signature: Edward Burtynsky's Anthropocene – in pictures" at The Guardian
Audio interview with Burtynsky
Images and profile at Specifier Magazine
Manufactured Langscapes, Ping Magazine. An interview with Burtynsky interspersed with his photographs.
 

1955 births
Living people
Artists from St. Catharines
Canadian photographers
Officers of the Order of Canada
Toronto Metropolitan University alumni
Canadian people of Ukrainian descent
Members of the Royal Canadian Academy of Arts
Directors of Genie and Canadian Screen Award winners for Best Documentary Film
Governor General's Award in Visual and Media Arts winners
20th-century Canadian artists
21st-century Canadian artists